The volleyball tournaments of NCAA Season 92 started on November 14, 2016. The College of Saint Benilde is currently hosting the tournament. Games are played at the Filoil Flying V Arena in San Juan, with two women's and men's games. The women's and men's semifinals' and finals' games are aired live by ABS-CBN Sports and Action and in High Definition on ABS-CBN Sports and Action HD 166.

Men's tournament

Elimination round

Season host is boldfaced.

Point system:
 3 points = win match in 3 or 4 sets
 2 points = win match in 5 sets
 1 point  = lose match in 5 sets
 0 point  = lose match in 3 or 4 sets

Game results 
Results to the right and top of the gray cells are first round games.

Playoffs

Semifinals

Finals
Best-of-three series

Awards
Finals' MVP: Isaiah Arda
Season Most Valuable Player: John Vic De Guzman
Rookie of the Year: Joshua Mina
1st Best Outside Spiker: Adrian Viray
2nd Best Outside Spiker: John Joseph Cabillan
1st Best Middle Blocker: Kevin Liberato
2nd Best Middle Blocker: Limuel Patenio
Best Opposite Spiker: John Vic De Guzman
Best Setter: Relan Taneo
Best Libero: Jack Kalingking()

Women's tournament

Elimination round

Season host is boldfaced.

Point system:
 3 points = win match in 3 or 4 sets
 2 points = win match in 5 sets
 1 point  = lose match in 5 sets
 0 point  = lose match in 3 or 4 sets

Game results 
Results to the right and top of the gray cells are first round games.

Playoffs

First round

Semifinals

Finals

Finals' Most Valuable Player: Jovielyn Prado
Coach of the Year: Obet Javier

Awards
Season Most Valuable Player: Grethcel Soltones
Rookie of the Year: Francesca Racraquin
1st Best Outside Spiker: Grethcel Soltones
2nd Best Outside Spiker: Jovelyn Prado
1st Best Middle Blocker: Ma. Lourdes Clemente
2nd Best Middle Blocker: Coleen Bravo
Best Opposite Spiker: Karen Joy Montojo
Best Setter: Vira Guillema
Best Libero: Alyssa Eroa

Juniors' Tournament

Elimination round

Season host is boldfaced.

Point system:
 3 points = win match in 3 or 4 sets
 2 points = win match in 5 sets
 1 point  = lose match in 5 sets 
 0 point  = lose match in 3 or 4 sets

Game results 
Results to the right and top of the gray cells are first round games.

Playoffs
Finals' Most Valuable Player: TBD
Coach of the Year: TBD

Awards
Season Most Valuable Player: Genesis Allan Redido
Rookie of the Year: Juciv Colina
1st Best Outside Spiker: Ederson Rebusora
2nd Best Outside Spiker: Francis Casas
1st Best Middle Blocker: Valeriano Sasis III
2nd Best Middle Spiker: Allen Angelo Calicdan
Best Opposite Spiker: Robbie Pamittan
Best Setter: Sean Michael Escallar
Best Libero: Zackhaery Dablo

Beach volleyball
The NCAA Season 92 beach volleyball tournament will be held in February 2017.

See also

UAAP Season 79 volleyball tournaments
NCAA Season 92

References

External links
Official website

2016 in Philippine sport
NCAA (Philippines) volleyball tournaments
2016 in volleyball